Frederick Chauncy (22 December 1904 – 4 June 1986) was a British hurdler. He competed in the men's 400 metres hurdles at the 1928 Summer Olympics.

References

External links
 

1904 births
1986 deaths
Athletes (track and field) at the 1928 Summer Olympics
British male hurdlers
Olympic athletes of Great Britain
Place of birth missing